Signal Over the City is a 1960 Yugoslav film directed by Žika Mitrović.  It is based on a screenplay by Slavko Goldstein.

Plot
In Karlovac in 1941, Tomo, a member of the Partisan headquarters, and Pero, a resistance member, are captured by the Ustashe. A group of Partisans, led by commander Ranko, enters the town with the objective to rescue Tomo and Pero before they succumb to torture and give away information. On they way out of the town, they are tracked down by Ustasha major Lukarić. Finding themselves entrapped, the Partisans decide to attempt a risky breakthrough over a bridge...

Cast
  as Ranko
 Velimir Bata Živojinović as Tošo
 Ivo Šubić as Tomo
 Ivo Pajić as Pero
 Tonko Lonza as major Lukarić

Background
The film is based on actual events that took place on 17 November 1941, when a group of 25 Partisans led by Većeslav Holjevac, disguised in Home Guard uniforms, entered Karlovac in order to rescue Marijan Čavić, a prominent Communist Party member captured by the Ustaše. Unbeknownst to Partisans, Čavić had already been transferred from the town hospital back to prison, so the actual raid, unlike its fictional counterpart, failed to achieve its objective. Nevertheless, it provided a morale boost for the anti-fascist resistance, as the event made the news on Radio London and Radio Moscow. According to Tatjana Holjevac daughter of Većeslav Holjevac, when Partisans entered Karlovac in reality they had Bosnian Fezzes on their heads and not as shown in the film, with Home Guard hats.

Reception
The Croatian Film Association's database describes Signal Over the City as a prime example of the urban, action-based branch of Partisan film, noting clarity and refinement both in its plot development and direction.

References

External links
 

1960 films
Serbian war drama films
Serbian-language films
Yugoslav war drama films
Jadran Film films
Croatian war films
World War II films based on actual events
Films set in 1941
Films set in Croatia
1960 war films
Yugoslav war films
War films set in Partisan Yugoslavia
Yugoslav World War II films
Croatian World War II films